Joseph Harold Baum (August 17, 1920 – October 5, 1998) was an American restaurateur and innovator responsible for creating the country's first themed restaurants, including The Four Seasons Restaurant, Windows on the World, and the restored Rainbow Room.  He was the first restaurateur to bring contemporary architects, artists and designers into his restaurant designs.

Early life and career
Joseph Harold Baum was born to Leo and Anna Baum in Saratoga Springs, New York, where his parents ran the Gross & Baum hotel.  He graduated from high school in Lakewood Township, New Jersey in 1938 and went on to earn a degree from Cornell University in hotel management in 1943.  After college, he served in the United States Navy aboard a destroyer-minelayer in the South Pacific.

In 1946, he went to work for Harris, Kerr, Foster & Company in Manhattan and took over the management of one of its hotels, the Monte Carlo, in 1947.  In 1949, he was hired by the Schine hotel chain in Florida.  Several years later, he was hired by Rikers Restaurant Associates (later shortened to Restaurant Associates) to open and manage a restaurant at Newark Airport called the Newarker, which became famous for its elegant dining, grandiose portions, and over-the-top flambée.

Restaurant Associates
After Baum's success at the Newarker, he took over the specialty restaurant division of Restaurant Associates in 1955, attracting talented individuals such as Stuart Levin, George Lang, Alan Lewis, Tom Margittai, and Paul Kovi to run the company's themed restaurants.  Baum spared no expense, hiring top architects, designers, and consultants such as James Beard and Julia Child.  He went on to become president of the company.  The portfolio of restaurants grew to over 130 by 1965 and included La Fonda Del Sol, Zum Zum, the Hawaiian Room, Quo Vadis, the Trattoria, the Brasserie, the Forum of the Twelve Caesars, Tavern on the Green, and The Four Seasons Restaurant.

Independent work and the Rainbow Room
Baum left Restaurant Associates to consult on his own, often working with Arthur Emil, and later, Michael Whiteman.  His projects included developing the 22 restaurants in the World Trade Center, including Windows on the World at the top of the North Tower. Windows was equally renowned for its wine program and wine school, known as Cellars in the Sky. His other projects included development of restaurants in the National Gallery of Art in Washington, DC, the Hallmark Cards Crown Center in Kansas City, and Place Bonaventure in Montréal.  In 1986, he opened his own restaurant in New York City called Aurora.  It remained open for five years.

In 1987, after a two-year $25 million renovation backed by David Rockefeller, Baum reopened the Rainbow Room in New York's Rockefeller Center. Baum also redesigned Windows on the World in 1996, a destination restaurant on the 107th Floor of the World Trade Center which he opened in 1976. During Baum's tenure, Windows on the World became the highest grossing restaurant in the world until its destruction on September 11, 2001.

Baum died on October 5, 1998, at the age of 78 due to prostate cancer.

Honors
Baum was inducted into the Culinary Institute of America Hall of Fame in 1995.

References
 http://nymag.com/nymetro/food/reviews/insatiable/2230/
 https://www.nytimes.com/1998/10/06/classified/paid-notice-deaths-baum-joseph.html
 Joe Baum’s Company Will Soldier On New York Times, Florence Fabricant November 18, 1998. Retrieved February 5, 2022
 Love Theme Restaurants? Here’s The Man to Thank New York Times, Florence Fabricant September 13, 1995. Retrieved February 5, 2022

1920 births
1998 deaths
American restaurateurs
20th-century American Jews
Cornell University School of Hotel Administration alumni
Deaths from prostate cancer
People from Lakewood Township, New Jersey
20th-century American businesspeople
James Beard Foundation Award winners
United States Navy personnel of World War II
Deaths from cancer in the United States